MS Wissenschaft ("MS Science") is an exhibition ship in Germany. It is named after , the German term for any study or science that involves systematic research and teaching. The ship travels through Germany and also through Switzerland and Austria for several months of the year showing temporary exhibitions in line with the respective Science Year.

Exhibition ship MS Wissenschaft

History 
The ship was built in 1969 at the former Elfring shipyard in Haren. In 2002, the University of Bremen hired the cargo ship, then called Geoschiff, which was used as a floating exhibition on geoscience for six months. Due to the success of this, MS Wissenschaft has been used as a science exhibition ship every summer since 2003. For the use as MS Wissenschaft the ship is converted every year.

Exhibitions 
On its tours, MS Wissenschaft visits numerous cities throughout Germany, which it can reach on inland waterways. In 2005, Basel in Switzerland, the first foreign city to be reached via the Rhine, was also on the tour schedule. Since 2010, several cities along the Danube in the neighboring country of Austria have also been visited.

References

External links 
 official website

1969 ships
Ships of Germany
Exhibitions in Germany